Chetan Krishna popularly known as Chetan Sosca is an Indian playback singer and composer who has performed the music for many Kannada films.

Career
Krishna’s film music debut was in the 2001 movie Kothigalu Saar Kothigalu. He has since sung over 1000 songs in Kannada movies. He has worked with Hamsalekha. Mano Murthy, Hari Krishna, V Manohar, R P Patnaik and Guru Kiran.

He composed the music for the 2017 film 1/4 kg Preethi.

He started his career in the year 2001 from kothigalu Saar kothigalu followed by tavarige baa tangi, nanjundi, title song for Nenapirali. He sang the pathos song "Janumada Gelathi" for the 2007 released film, Cheluvina Chittara. Following this song, he began to receive offers to sing in many films. In 2008, he recorded songs for films such as Moggina Manasu, Taj Mahal and Chaitrada Chandrama.

In 2009 his song "Yaare Nee Devatheya" for the film Ambaari won awards including Filmfare South Indian Awards, Karnataka State Film Awards, Suvarna Film Awards, Mirchi Music Award south, South scope cine awards.

In the 2010 film Pancharangi he sang the title track and its sloka version. He also sang songs for films such as Krishnan Love Story, adduri. In 2011, his song "Yaarig Helona" from Lifeu Ishtene won awards like Filmfare South Indian Awards, Suvarna Film Awards , Mirchi Music Award south indian award and the Santhosham south indian award.

His song Pyarge Aagbittaite for the film Govindaya Namaha was successful and won Mirchi music award and was nominated for Filmfare award Recent works include "Cindrella" (Addhuri), "Be Be Be" (Rana), "Ninthu Nodalenu" (Shikari), "Appu Hey Appu" (Dev Son of Mudde Gowda).

He has played in the Karnataka  basketball team. He has also played handball in the Karnataka state senior handball team 7 times in the national championships.

Filmography

 Nenapirali
 Hudugaata
 Janumadaa gelathi (movie- cheluvina chittara)
 Yaare nee devatheya ( movie- Ambaari)
 Life ishtene (movie- Pancharangi)
 Yaarig helona namma problem (movie- lifu ishtene)
 Nenapirali (movie- vie- hudugaata)
 Sogase sogase – (movie – rishi) 
 kotigalu saar kotigalu
 dumbee
 joot
 chelvi
 jogula
 tavarige baa thangi
 nanjundi
 gowdru
 Pandavaru
 My Autograph
 Madana
 Hudugaata
 Jambada Hudugi
 Cheluvina Chittara (janumada gelati)
 Pallakki  (o priya...)
 Hettare Hennane Herabeku
 Moggina Manasu
 Malenada Mallige
 Taj Mahal
 Chaitrada Chandrama
 Navashakthi Vaibhava
 Ambari
 Aa
 Raavana
 Chickpete Sachagalu
 Chellidaru Sampigeya
 Eshtu Nagthi Nagu
 Hatrick Hodi Maga
 Cheluvina Chilipili
 Nirudyogi
 Jokaali
 Hrudayagala Vishya
 Minugu
 Varshadhaare
 Pancharangi
 Mr. Theertha
 Krishnan Love Story
 Lifeu Ishtene
 Mr. Duplicate
 Dandam Dashagunam
 Govindaya Namaha   (pyar ke agbitayte)
 Addhuri (yarilla yarilla nenante yarila)
 Dev Son of Mudde Gowda
 Kiladi Kitty
 Hosa Prema Purana

Awards

State Awards
 2009 – Karnataka State Film Award for Best Male Playback Singer – "Yaare Nee Devatheya" (Ambari)

Filmfare Awards
 2009 – Filmfare Award for Best Male Playback Singer – Kannada – "Yaare Nee Devatheya" (Ambaari)
 2011 – Filmfare Award for Best Male Playback Singer – Kannada – "Yaarig Helona" (Lifeu Ishtene)
 2013 – Filmfare Award Nomination for Best Male Playback Singer – Kannada – "pyaege aagbittaite" (Govindaya Namaha)

Suvarna Film Awards
 2010 – Suvarna Film Award for Best Male Playback Singer – "Yaare Nee Devatheya" (Ambaari)
 2011 – suvarna film award for Best Male Playback Singer – "Yaarig Helona" (Lifeu Ishtene)

Mirchi music awards

 2009 – Mirchi Music Awards Best Male playback Singer – "Yaare Nee Devatheya" (Ambaari)
 2009 – Mirchi Music Awards song of the year(critics) – "Yaare Nee Devatheya" (Ambaari)
 2012 – Mirchi Music Awards Best Male playback Singer – "pyarge aagbittaite"  (govindaya namaha)

Other Awards

 2009 – South Scope Music Awards Best Male playback Singer – "Yaare Nee Devatheya" (Ambaari)
 2006 – E TV Award for Best Singer – "Nenapirali" (Nenapirali)
 2006 – Udaya Award for Best Singer- "Nenapirali" (Nenapirali)
 1997 – Aryabhata award- Achievement in Ghazals
 2011 – chitrarasikara sangha award – "lifu ishtene" ( Pancharangi)
 2008 – chitrapremigala sangha award – "janumada gelathi" ( cheluvina chittara)
 2011 – santhosham film award for Best Male Playback Singer – "Yaarig Helona" (Lifeu Ishtene)

References

External links
http://musicindiaonline.co/list_albums/i/31-Kannada_Movie_Songs/12335-Chetan_Sosca/#/list_albums/i/31-Kannada_Movie_Songs/12335-Chetan_Sosca/  
 chetan  Singer Songwriter from bangalore, IN
 
 Book Chetan Sosca for event  Request Chetan Sosca for performance  Learn Hindustani Classical Vocal, Kathak, Tabla, Light Vocal, Flute, Harmonium, Sitar, Modern dance forms, Bharatnatyam

Year of birth missing (living people)
Living people
Indian male playback singers
Filmfare Awards South winners
Kannada playback singers
Singers from Bangalore